Andrea Elisabeth Maria Jürgens (15 May 1967 – 20 July 2017) was a German schlager singer. She became famous as a child star in the late 1970s when she had her first hit with "Und dabei liebe ich euch beide" (And Yet I Love You Both) at age 10. She had been active in the music business ever since with more than 60 single releases.

Career

Early years
Andrea Jürgens was the daughter of Margret and Heinz Jürgens, and was born in Wanne-Eickel, North Rhine-Westphalia, West Germany. She performed her debut hit "Und dabei liebe ich euch beide" (And Yet I Love You Both) in her very first television appearance which took place in the ARD-Silvestergala on New Year's Eve of 1977/1978. The song was written by Jack White and Jon Athan. Its lyrics address the post-divorce situation from a child's perspective. Further appearances on various television and radio shows followed. In the March 1978 Andrea Jürgens was the viewers'-choice winner on ZDF-Hitparade, a television show conducted by Dieter Thomas Heck.

In the fall of 1978 the follow-ups to the debut hit were released. "Ich zeige Dir mein Paradies" (I'll Show You My Paradise) and "Tina ist weg" (Tina's missing), together with her success in the so-called hit parades concluded Andrea Jürgens' position as the first big child star in Germany since Heintje. In 1979 she gained further success with "Ein Herz für Kinder" (A Heart For Children) and "Eine Rose für dich" (A Rose For You).

In October 1979 the Christmas album Weihnachten mit Andrea Jürgens was published. Its sales exceeded 1,5 million copies in just three months. Consequently, the album achieved multiple gold records and double platinum. The album included the single "Aba Heidschi Bumbeidschi", a traditional lullaby.

1980s
Jürgens' commercial success continued in a smaller scale in the early 1980s. The folk music album Andrea Jürgens singt die schönsten deutschen Volkslieder was released in 1981. Her next single hits were "Mama Lorraine" (1981), "Japanese Boy" (1981), and "Playa Blanca" (1984). Like "Manuel Goodbye" (1983), "Playa Blanca" was originally sung in English by Audrey Landers. Jack White produced the German versions for Andrea Jürgens.

The albums Solang’ ein Mädchen träumen kann (As Long as a Girl Can Dream) (1982) and Weil wir uns lieben (Because We Love Each Other) (1984) were not chart busters like their predecessors. In the latter half of the decade, no new studio albums were released. However, she released some singles (e.g. "Ciao ciao amore") and a "Best Of" compilation which was published in 1987.

1990s and afterwards
Jürgens' next studio albums, Küsse der Nacht (Kisses of the Night) and Liebe (Love), were released in the early 1990s. The album Ich krieg' nie genug von dir (I Never Get Enough of You) was released in 1993. Once again, it included a song originally interpreted by Audrey Landers, namely "Guten Morgen Sonnenschein" (Good Morning Sunshine). In 1996 Jürgens recorded the single "Wir greifen nach den Sternen" (We Reach For the Stars) together with the Nockalm Quintett. The song was included in the album Wenn ich glücklich bin (1996), the opening track of which is the German cover version of Madonna's hit "You'll See", "Du wirst sehen".

In 2002, Jürgens celebrated her 25-year singing career. The anniversary was celebrated by publishing the jubilee album Dankeschön zum 25jährigen Bühnenjubiläum. In the new century she changed her record company from BMG to KOCH. Lust aufs Leben (Love of Life) (2005) was her first studio album under the new label. Jack White and Peter Wagner had been the producers of Jürgens' albums during her BMG-years, Mr White often mentioned as the executive producer on the album cover. In KOCH her producer has been Alfons Weindorf.

Her early albums were published in a non-plastic CD-box in 2006 by White Records. The albums are: Ich zeige dir mein Paradies (I'll Show You My Paradise), Eine Rose schenk ich dir...und dieses Lied (I Give You a Rose ... and This Song), Irgendwann wird jedes Mädchen mal 17 (Every Girl Turns 17 Sometime), Mama Lorraine and Solang’ ein Mädchen träumen kann (As Long as a Girl Can Dream), each with original cover artwork.

Her new album Millionen von Sternen was released in March 2016, including the singles Millionen von Sternen, Das reicht für mehr als eine Nacht and Déjà vu.

She died of kidney failure on 20 July 2017, aged 50.

Lyrics
The lyrics of Jürgens' songs are mainly about typical schlager themes, like friendship and love. The divorce theme in her very first hit "Und dabei liebe ich euch beide" (1977) was a major exception. In the German schlager scene divorce was a taboo subject until the 1970s; lyrics were mainly about harmonious relationships. During the decade, divorce reforms and public discussion of the reasons and consequences of divorce changed all this.

Awards
Jürgens was awarded various national music prizes. She achieved many silver, gold and platinum records for her singles and albums. The album Weihnachten mit Andrea Jürgens (Christmas with Andrea Jürgens) has achieved multiple gold and platinum. It has been commercially available throughout the year since its first publication. In 1982 and 1983, Jürgens was granted the Goldene Stimmgabel (Golden Tuning Fork).

Discography

Albums
 Ich zeige dir mein Paradies (1978) (D #41)
 Eine Rose schenk ich dir (1979)
 Weihnachten mit Andrea Jürgens - Meine 20 schönsten Weihnachtslieder (1979) (D #1, A #19)
 Irgendwann wird jedes Mädchen mal 17 (1980)
 Andrea Jürgens singt die schönsten deutschen Volkslieder (1981) (D #18)
 Mama Lorraine (1981)
 Solang' ein Mädchen träumen kann (1982)
 Weil wir uns lieben (1984)
 Küsse der Nacht (1990)
 Liebe (1992)
 Ich krieg nie genug von dir (1993)
 Wir tanzen Lambada (1994)
 Wenn ich glücklich bin (1996)
 Komm in meine Träume (2000)
 Andrea Jürgens singt die schönsten deutschen Weihnachtslieder - neu produziert (2001)
 Dankeschön zum 25jährigen Bühnenjubiläum (2002)
 Lust aufs Leben (2005) (D # 97)
 Stille Nacht heilige Nacht (2005)
 Verbotene Träume (2008)
 Du hast mir total gefehlt - 16 große Single-Hits (2008)
 Ich hab nur ein Herz (2010)
 Millionen von Sternen (2016) (D #10, A #15, CH #52)
 Auf Du und Du (2018) (D #6, A #21, CH #41)

Compilations
 10 Jahre Andrea Jürgens - Die großen Erfolge (1987)
 Amore, Amore - Ihre schönsten Lovesongs (1991)
 Die Grossen Erfolge - Stargala (1996)
 Momente - Die Grössten Erfolge aus 20 Jahren (1997)
 Nur das Beste - Die Grossen Erfolge 1983–2000 (2000)
 Best of (2005)
 Die frühen Erfolge - 5 er CD Box - die ersten 5 Alben erstmals auf CD (2006)
 Das Allerbeste (2008)
 Sonderedition Vol. 1 (2012)
 Wunschkonzert (2013)
 Das Beste (2014) (D #18; A #57)
 Das Beste - DVD (2014) (A #4)
 40 Jahre - Die Andrea Jürgens Collection (2017) (D #57)
 Das Beste – Ein Kinderstar wird 50 (2017) (D #75)
 Das Beste – Die Jubiläumsausgabe (2017) (D #31)
 Das Beste – Gedenk-Edition (2017) (D #87)
 Danke, Andrea! (2017) (D #80)

Literature
Dieter Moll: Die deutschen Schlager der 70er Jahre. Heel AG, Schindellegi (Schweiz) 1996;

References

External links
Official Website 
Portrait on BMG Music 

1967 births
2017 deaths
People from Herne, North Rhine-Westphalia
German child singers
German women singers
Schlager musicians
Deaths from kidney failure